Karl-Rüdiger Mann (born 24 March 1950) is a retired East German swimmer. In 1968 he won the national championships in the 1500 m freestyle event and was selected for the 1968 Summer Olympics, but failed to reach the finals.

References

1950 births
Living people
Swimmers from Leipzig
German male freestyle swimmers
Olympic swimmers of East Germany
Swimmers at the 1968 Summer Olympics